Sawka is a surname. Notable people with the surname include:

Jan Sawka (1946–2012), Polish-born American artist and architect
KJ Sawka, American musician, record producer, and DJ
Mary Walker-Sawka (born c. 1916), Canadian film producer
Richard John Sawka II, a.k.a. Colby Keller (born 1980), American visual artist, blogger and former pornographic film actor